The 2012–13 Ohio Bobcats men's basketball team represented Ohio University during the 2012–13 NCAA Division I men's basketball season. The Bobcats, led by first year head coach Jim Christian, played their home games at the Convocation Center and were members of the East Division of the Mid-American Conference. They finished the season 24–10, 14–2 in the East Division to claim a share of the East Division and MAC regular season championship with Akron. They lost in the championship game of the MAC tournament to Akron. They were invited to the 2013 NIT where they lost in the first round to Denver.

The Ohio University Bobcat fans continued to show support for the team leading the MAC in fan attendance for the 7th time in the last 8 seasons, averaging just under 7,000 fans attending each game.

Roster

Preseason

Media voting 
On October 29, the members of the MAC News Media Panel voted in the Preseason Media Poll.  Ohio was the favorite in the MAC East and the MAC tournament.

Tournament champs
Ohio (18), Akron (6)

Preseason All-MAC 

Source

Schedule

|-
!colspan=9 style=| Exhibition

|-
!colspan=9 style=| Regular Season

|-
!colspan=9 style=|MAC Tournament

|-
!colspan=9 style=| NIT

^ Game was originally scheduled for 1/30/2013, but was postponed due to the closure of the Ohio campus following an armed robbery near the university.

Statistics

Team Statistics
Final 2012–13 Statistics

Source

Player statistics

Source

Awards and honors

All-MAC Awards 

Source

Final awards watchlists

References

Ohio Bobcats men's basketball seasons
Ohio
Ohio
Bob
Bob